Nea Ionia is a metro station in Nea Ionia, Athens, Greece.

The first station on this site was open from 1922 to 1938. This station was named Podarades (Ποδαράδες) for an older name of the settlement which later became the city of Nea Ionia, named for refugees from an area formerly called Ionia in Asia Minor.  The present Metro station was opened on 14 March 1956 under its present name. It was the northernmost terminus of Line 1 until March 4, 1957.  The station, which features two side platforms was renovated in 2003–4.

References

External links
 

Athens Metro stations
Railway stations opened in 1956
1956 establishments in Greece